Men's Downhill World Cup 1968/1969

Final point standings

In Men's Downhill World Cup 1968/69 the best 3 results count.

References
 fis-ski.com

External links
 

Men's Downhill
FIS Alpine Ski World Cup men's downhill discipline titles